Senecio squalidus, known as Oxford ragwort, is a flowering plant in the daisy family Asteraceae. It is a yellow-flowered herbaceous plant, native to mountainous, rocky or volcanic areas, that has managed to find other homes on man-made and natural piles of rocks, war-ruined neighborhoods and even on stone walls. These habitats resemble its well drained natural rocky homeland. The plants have spread via the wind, rail and the activities of botanists. The travels of this short-lived perennial, biennial, or winter annual make it a good subject for studies of the evolution and ecology of flowering plants.

Description
Like all members of the family Asteraceae, Senecio squalidus has a composite flower head known as a capitulum. What look like single flowers are actually a cluster of florets, each petal or ligule being a flower, or floret, possessing its own stamen and capable of producing the specialized seed of the family Asteraceae, the parachute-like achene.

S. squalidus  prefers dry, disturbed places, cultivated and waste ground, walls and railway banks. It flowers from March to December  
and reproduces from seed.

Leaves and stems S. squalidus leaves are alternate, glossy, almost hairless and variable in form from deeply pinnately lobed to undivided  with only the lower leaves being stalked. Stems and leaves resemble those of the common groundsel (Senecio vulgaris) with the exception that their lobes are more widely spaced.

Inflorescence S. squalidus has larger capitula than Senecio jacobaea and a more spreading habit. Yellow capitula of 10-14 petals in loose clusters. They are pollinated by insects.

Oxford ragwort is self-incompatible and needs pollen from other plants with different self-incompatibility alleles;

 its own flower possess a stigma with characteristics of both the “dry” and “wet” types.

The fruiting heads are often nodding.

Each plant can produce approximately 10,000 fruits during the year.

As a Senecio and a diploid Senecio squalidus is part of a species group along with S. flavus, S. gallicus, S. glaucus and S. vernalis, which are widespread geographically and interesting for the study of genetic differences in relation to the environment and plant evolution.

History

This Senecio was introduced into Britain via Francesco Cupani and William Sherard in the years of their visit  1700, 1701 and 1702 from Sicily 
where it lives as a native on volcanic ash to the Duchess of Beaufort's garden at Badminton. Later a transfer of the plant material to the Oxford Botanic Garden by the "Horti Praefectus" (the title still given to the head gardener at the Oxford Botanic Garden) Jacob Bobart the Younger took place before his death in 1719, providing perhaps a good indication of when this species of ragwort and other invasive species might have "escaped" and started to make their home in the greater British Isles. The Sicilian ragwort escaped into the wild and grew in the stonework of Oxford colleges (with the specific mention of the Bodleian Library) and many of the stone walls around the city of Oxford. This gave the plant its common name, "Oxford Ragwort".

Carl Linnaeus first described Senecio squalidus in 1753, although there is a dispute as to whether the material came from the Botanic Garden or from walls in the city; the taxonomy for this species is further complicated by the existence of species with a similar morphology in continental Europe.

James Edward Smith officially identified the escaped Oxford ragwort with its formal name Senecio squalidus in 1800.

During the Industrial Revolution, Oxford became connected to the railway system and the plant gained a new habitat in the railway lines clinker beds, gradually spreading via the railway to other parts of the country. The process was accelerated by the movement of the trains   
and the limestone ballast that provides a well-drained medium which is an adequate replica of the lava-soils of its native home in Sicily.

During the 20th century it continued to spread along railway lines and found a liking for waste places and bombed sites after World War II which have a lot in common with the volcanic regions of its home.

Recently, this and other Senecio species and their differing tastes for self-incompatibility and self-compatibility have been the subject of study for the purposes of understanding the evolution of plant species as the genus finds new homes and pollen partners throughout the world:  
The origin of Senecio vulgaris var. hibernicus Syme was determined to be an introgression of Senecio squalidus into Senecio vulgaris subsp vulgaris
The dual origin of S. cambrensis  Rosser to both Wales and Scotland explained as being a product parenting by the diploid S. squalidus and the tetraploid S. vulgaris in both locations
The willingness of S. squalidus to hybridize with Senecio viscosus Crisp & Jones and forms the sterile hybrid S. subnebrodensis Simk.
The suggestion that S. squalidus is actually a hybrid of two other Sicilian Senecio: S. aethnensis Jan ex DC and S. chrysanthemifolius Poir.

Distribution
Senecio squalidus grows on scree in mountainous regions of native range, and earned its common name Oxford ragwort for its willingness and ability to grow in similar habitat elsewhere in the world.

Native
Senecio squalidus is considered to be a native of New Brunswick and Nova Scotia, Canada by the USDA Natural Resources Conservation Service while the same USDA other resource Germplasm Resources Information Network considers it to be native to  Austria, Czech Republic, Slovakia, Germany, Switzerland, Albania, Bulgaria, Greece, Crete, Italy, Sardinia, Sicily, Romania, Bosnia and Herzegovina, Croatia, Montenegro, North Macedonia, Serbia, Slovenia.
Current
Africa
Northern Africa: Morocco
America
North America: New Brunswick, Nova Scotia, British Columbia, California

Europe
Northern Europe: Denmark, Germany, Republic of Ireland, Netherlands,  Norway, Sweden, United Kingdom
Middle Europe: Austria, Czech Republic, Hungary, Slovakia, Switzerland
East Europe: Poland,
Southeastern Europe: Albania, Bosnia and Herzegovina, Bulgaria
Southwestern Europe: France, Spain
South Europe:  Croatia, Crete, Greece, Italy, North Macedonia, Romania, Sardinia, Serbia, Sicily, Slovenia

Range Maps

Predators 
S. squalidus is a food plant for some insects, for example:

Flies
Gall flies (Diptera: Tephritidae):
Sphenella marginata
Trupanea stellata
Trypeta zoe

Fungi

Most Senecio, including S. squalidus are susceptible to rust and other fungus and mildews:
Rust fungus Uredinales
Coleosporium tussilaginis - (Coleosporiaceae)
Puccinia lagenophorae - (Pucciniaceae)
White rust Peronosporales
Albugo tragopogonis - (Albuginaceae)
Sac fungus Ascochyta, Pezizomycetes
Ascochyta senecionicola - (Coelomycete)
Powdery Mildew Erysiphales
Podosphaera fusca - (Erysiphaceae)

Synonyms and misapplied names
Jacobaea incisa C. Presl
Senecio glaber Ucria
Senecio incisus (C. Presl) C. Presl
Senecio laciniatus Bertol.
Senecio nebrodensis auct., non L.
Senecio rupestris Waldst. & Kit.
Senecio squalidus d'Urv.
Senecio squalidus Willd.
Senecio squalidus M.Bieb.
Senecio nebrodensis L. subsp. rupestris (Waldst. & Kit.) Fiori
Senecio leucanthemifolius subsp. vernalis (Waldst. & Kit.) Greuter
Senecio squalidus subsp. aethnensis (DC.) Greuter
Senecio squalidus subsp. araneosus (Emb. & Maire) Alexander
Senecio squalidus subsp. aurasicus (Batt.) Alexander
Senecio squalidus subsp. aurasiacus (Batt. & Trab.) Alexander
Senecio squalidus subsp. chrysanthemifolius (Poir.) Greuter
Senecio squalidus subsp. eurasiacus (Batt. & Trab.) Alexander
Senecio squalidus subsp. microglossus (Guss.) Arcang.
Senecio squalidus subsp. rupestris (Waldst. & Kit.) Greuter
Senecio squalidus subsp. sardous (Fiori) Greuter
Senecio squalidus subsp. squalidus
Senecio squalidus var. glaber (Ucria) FIORI
Misapplied names
Senecio nebrodensis sec. Fiori, A

References

Further reading

External links 

squalidus
Environment of Oxfordshire
History of Oxford
Flora of North America
Plants described in 1753
Taxa named by Carl Linnaeus